See Bananal for namesakes

The Microregion of Bananal is a microregion in the east of São Paulo State, Brazil.

It is the easternmost microregion of the state, bordered by the state of Rio de Janeiro to the east.

Municipalities 
The microregion consists of the following municipalities:
 Bananal city
 Arapeí
 Areias
 São José do Barreiro
 Silveiras

References

See also 
 Bananal Island
 the former Catholic Territorial Prelature of Bananal

Bananal